Blondy may refer to:

Nickname:
J. T. "Blondy" Black (1920–2000), professional American football player
Thomas Graydon (1881–1949), American football player
John Romig (1898–1984), American middle-distance runner
Blondy Ryan (1906–1959), American Major League Baseball shortstop
Blondy Wallace (died 1937), early professional football player and later convicted criminal, associate of Nucky Johnson

Other:
Alpha Blondy (born 1953), African reggae singer and international recording artist
Michel Blondy (1675–1739), French choreographer and dancer

See also 
 Blondie (disambiguation)

Lists of people by nickname